The Diocese of Lebombo (pt. Diocese Anglicana dos Libombos) is a diocese in the Anglican Church of Mozambique and Angola. It is one of the three Anglican dioceses of Mozambique. This diocese is the most southerly of the three, the others being the Diocese of Niassa and the Diocese of Nampula.

History 
The diocese was a result of the British missionary activity in Portuguese Mozambique, in the 19th century. The first bishop nominated of the Anglican Diocese of Lebombo was William Edmund Smyth, in 1893, who would be in functions until 1912. Only after the beginning of the war of independence between Portugal and the FRELIMO, the diocese would have his first Portuguese language bishop, Daniel Pina Cabral, a white European born prelate. Pina Cabral developed friendly relationships with the Roman Catholic bishops of Mozambique and established contact with members of the FRELIMO. He would be in office from 1969 to 1976, shortly after the independence. He was succeeded by the first Mozambican-born black bishop, Dinis Sengulane, in office from 1976 to 2014. He was succeeded by Carlos Matsinhe.

Structure
The seat of the diocesan bishop is the Cathedral of St Augustine in Maciene in Mozambique. The largest city in the diocese is Maputo.

The diocese is divided into 6 archdeaconries: Inhambane District, Limpopo, Maciene, Maputo District, Pungoe and Umbeluzi.

There are advanced plans for the division of the diocese into three separate dioceses. At the 2012 Provincial Synod of the Church of Southern Africa these plans were first discussed in detail, and as an interim measure two new episcopal areas were to be created in Lebombo Diocese, with two Area Bishops appointed to work with the Diocesan Bishop. The 21st session of the diocesan synod, meeting in October 2015, confirmed these plans, and also stated that the new dioceses would be named Inhambane and Pungue.

List of Bishops 

 William Edmund Smyth 1893-1912
 John Latimer Fuller 1913-1920
 Leonard Noel Fisher 1921-1928
 Basil William Peacey 1929-1936
 Dennis Victor 1936-1948
 John Boys 1948-1952
 Humphry Beevor 1952-1958
 Stanley Chapman Pickard 1958-1969
 Daniel Pina Cabral 1969-1976
 Dinis Sengulane 1976-2014
 Carlos Matsinhe 2014-present (consecrated 28 September 2014)

References

Sources

 
 
 

Anglicanism in Mozambique
1893 establishments in Mozambique